Jesús Hilario Tundidor (22 June 1935 – 2 May 2021) was a Spanish poet.

Awards and honors
Premio Castilla y León de las Letras (2013, received in 2014)

References

1935 births
2021 deaths
Spanish poets
People from Zamora, Spain